Caulocera xantholopha is a moth of the subfamily Arctiinae. It is found on Borneo (Pulo Laut).

References

Lithosiini